Talhotblond is a 2009 documentary directed by Barbara Schroeder. It details an Internet love triangle that resulted in a real-life murder.

Plot
Thomas Montgomery (screen name: marinesniper), a 47-year-old married man, pleaded guilty to murdering his 22-year-old co-worker Brian Barrett (screen name: beefcake). The two men were involved in a love triangle with "Jessi", whom they thought to be an 18-year-old girl with the screen name 'talhotblond'. While both men knew each other from work, neither had ever met "Jessi" in person.

In the beginning of their online relationship, Thomas presented himself as an 18-year-old man named "Tommy" who was in basic training and later deployed. His wife later discovered the affair and revealed the truth to "Jessi", but the two continued to chat.

However, while "Jessi" was a real person, Thomas had been chatting with her mother, Mary Shieler, posing as her daughter online. Jessi was unaware of her mother's actions until after Barrett was murdered and her mother's role in the case became public.

Production
The film's TV rights were sold to MSNBC. Paramount Studios bought all remaining rights. Directed and written by Emmy award-winning journalist Barbara Schroeder, the film features appearances by convicted murderer Thomas Montgomery, clinical psychologist and attorney Dr. Rex Julian Beaber, Erie County prosecutor Ken Case, Erie County Sheriff Ron Kenyon; Oak Hill, West Virginia Sgt. Lee Kirk; the parents of Brian Barrett, and Tim Shieler. Dr. Beaber serves throughout the film as a commentator on the social-psychological dimensions of the case.

Awards
Winner of the Seattle International Film Festival's 2009 Best Documentary Grand Jury Award and a finalist at the International Documentary Film Festival Amsterdam.

Lifetime movie
On June 23, 2012, Lifetime aired a television film based on the story, TalhotBlond, directed by Courteney Cox, with Garret Dillahunt as Thomas and Laura San Giacomo as Carol (this character's name is different from that of the real-life wife), the busy wife and mother who slowly starts feeling disconnected from her husband. Brian Barrett, Montgomery's young coworker, was portrayed by Brando Eaton.

Cox appeared in the film as well, as Carol's friend, coworker, and confidante. The names of Jessi and Mary Shieler were changed to Katie (played by Ashley Hinshaw) and Beth (played by Molly Hagan) Brooks, respectively. The Shielers' location was moved from West Virginia to Indiana.

References

External links
 

2009 documentary films
2009 films
American documentary films
Documentary films about crime in the United States
Documentary films about the Internet
2000s English-language films
2000s American films